This is a list of notable artists born in Scotland and/or well known for their work in Scotland, arranged alphabetically by surname and by period.

Born before 1700
John Alexander (died 1733), painter and engraver
Arnold Bronckhorst (fl. 1565–1583), Dutch painter, the first King's Painter of Scotland
William Gouw Ferguson (1632/3 – c. 1689), still life painter, active in France and Italy
Gawen Hamilton (1698–1737), painter largely working in London
George Heriot (1563–1624), Scottish goldsmith and jeweler
George Jamesone (or Jameson, c. 1587–1644), Scotland's first eminent portrait painter
David Paton, active 1660–1700, painter of miniatures
François Quesnel (c. 1543–1619), Scotland-born French painter
John Michael Wright (1617–1694), portrait painter in the Baroque style

Born 1700–1799
Cosmo Alexander (c. 1724–1772), noted North American portrait painter
David Allan (1744–1796), painter of historical subjects
Andrew Bell (1726–1809), engraver and printer, co-founder of Encyclopædia Britannica
John Zephaniah Bell (1794–1883), painter
John Brown (1752–1787), artist
Thomas Campbell (1790–1858), sculptor
Alexander Carse (c. 1770–1843), painter known for scenes of Scottish life
Robert Edmonstone (1794–1834), painter
Robert Freebairn (1765–1808), landscape painter
Andrew Geddes (1783–1844), portrait painter and etcher
John Watson Gordon (1788–1864), painter
Gavin Hamilton (1723–1798), Scottish neoclassical history painter
David Ramsay Hay (1798–1866), artist, interior decorator and colour theorist
Andrew Henderson (1783–1835), portrait painter
John Kay (1742–1826), caricaturist and engraver
William Home Lizars (1788–1859), painter and engraver
William Miller (1796–1882), engraver
Jacob More (1740–1793), landscape painter
William Mossman, 1793–1851, sculptor
Alexander Nasmyth (1758–1840), landscape painter
Patrick Nasmyth (1787–1831), landscape painter, son of Alexander
Jane Nasmyth (1788–1867), landscape painter, daughter of Alexander
Barbara Nasmyth (1790–1870), landscape painter, daughter of Alexander
Anne Nasmyth (1798–1874), landscape painter, daughter of Alexander
Henry Raeburn (1756–1823), portrait painter
Allan Ramsay (1713–1784), painter
David Roberts (1796–1864), painter and lithographer
Alexander Robertson (1772–1841), painter, brother of Andrew and Archibald
Andrew Robertson (1777–1845), miniaturist painter
Archibald Robertson (1765–1835), painter
Alexander Runciman (1736–1785), painter of historical and mythical subjects
John Runciman (1744–1768/9), painter known for Biblical and literary scenes, brother of Alexander
Archibald Skirving (1749–1819), portrait painter
Reverend John Thomson (1778–1840), landscape painter and minister of Duddingston Kirk
William John Thomson RSA (1771–1845), portrait and miniaturist painter
George Watson (1767–1837), painter
David Wilkie (1785–1841), painter
Hugh William Williams (1773–1829), landscape painter
William Yellowlees (1796–1855), portrait painter

Born 1800–1899
John Brown Abercromby (1843–1929), painter ranging from traditional portraiture to avant-garde modernism
Patrick Adam (1852–1929), painter 
Robert Adamson (1821–1848), photographer
John Macdonald Aiken (1880–1961), water-colourist and oil painter
Lena Alexander (1899–1983), painter
Jessie Algie (1859–1927), flower painter
Andrew Allan (1863–1942), lithographer
Robert Weir Allan (1851–1942), water-colour and oil painter of landscape and marine subjects
Marion Ancrum (fl. 1885–1919), water-colour painter
Hazel Armour (1894–1985), sculptor and medallist
George Bain (1881–1968), art teacher whose writing revived interest in Celtic and Insular art
James Ballantine (1806–1877), artist and author
Penelope Beaton (1886–1963), painter 
Jemima Blackburn (1823–1909), painter and illustrator
John Blair (c. 1849–1934), painter
Muirhead Bone (1876–1953), etcher
Phyllis Bone (1894–1972), sculptor 
William Bonnar (1800–1863), portraitist and history and genre painter
William Brodie (1815–1881), sculptor
Robert Brough (1872–1905), painter
John Crawford Brown (1805–1867), landscape artist
William Kellock Brown (1856–1934), sculptor
Elizabeth York Brunton (1880 – c. 1960), painter
Robert Bryden (1865–1939), artist, sculptor and engraver
Thomas Stuart Burnett (1853–1888), sculptor 
Francis Campbell Boileau Cadell (1883–1937), member of the Scottish Colourists school
James Cadenhead (1858–1927), painter
Alexander Milne Calder (1846–1923), sculptor known for the architectural sculpture of Philadelphia City Hall
Sir David Young Cameron (1865–1945), painter and etcher
Mary Cameron (1865–1921), portraitist
George Paul Chalmers (1833–1878), painter
Thomas J Clapperton (1879–1962), sculptor
James Cowie (1886–1956), painter
Hugh Adam Crawford (1898–1982), painter
William Crozier (1893–1930), landscape painter
Jessie Alexandra Dick (1896–1976), painter and teacher
Sir William Fettes Douglas (1822–1891), painter
Thomas Millie Dow (1848–1919), painter, member of the Glasgow Boys school
Jack M. Ducker (born 1890), painter specializing in Highland landscapes
Ian Fairweather (1891–1974), Scottish/Australian painter
Christian Jane Fergusson (1876–1957), Dumfries and Galloway landscape and still-life painter
John Duncan Fergusson (1874–1961), member of the Scottish Colourists school
Henry Snell Gamley (1865–1928), sculptor specialising in war memorials and tombs
Robert Gavin (1827–1883), painter
William Geissler (1894–1963), water-colourist of the natural world
David Cooke Gibson (1827–1856), painter and poet
James William Giles (1801–1870), Scottish landscape painter
Sir William George Gillies (1898–1973), landscape and still-life painter
Constance Frederica "Eka" Gordon-Cumming (1837–1924), travel writer and painter
Mary Grant 1831–1908, sculptor
Norah Neilson Gray (1882–1931), Glasgow School artist
Herbert James Gunn (1893–1964), portraitist
James Guthrie (1859–1930), painter
Maggie Hamilton (1867–1952), painter
Peter Alexander Hay (1866–1952)
John Henderson (1860–1924), painter and Director of Glasgow School of Art
Joseph Henderson (1832–1908), Scottish landscape painter
George Henry (1858–1943), painter, one of the most prominent of the Glasgow School
Joseph Morris Henderson (1863–1936), Scottish landscape painter
Amelia Robertson Hill (née Paton, 1821–1904), sculptor and artist, wife of David Octavius
David Octavius Hill (1802–1870), painter and photography pioneer as Hill & Adamson
Edward Atkinson Hornel (1864–1933), painter of landscapes, flowers and foliage with children
Anna Hotchkis (1885–1985), painter
John Kelso Hunter (1802–1873), portrait painter and book author
George Leslie Hunter (1877–1931), painter and Scottish Colourist
Beatrice Huntington (1889–1988), artist, sculptor and musician
John Hutchison, (1832–1910), sculptor
Alexander Johnston (1815–1891), painter known for genre and history subjects
Dorothy Johnstone (1892–1980), painter of landscapes and portraits, especially children
Jeka Kemp (1876–1966), painter
Annabel Kidston (1896–1981), painter
Jessie M King (1875–1949), illustrator mainly of children's books, designer of jewellery and fabric
Annie Rose Laing  (1869–1946), painter
Robert Scott Lauder (1803–1869), artist and portrait painter
Andrew Law (1873–1967), artist and portrait painter
William Mustart Lockhart (1855–1941), artist mainly of Glasgow-area landscapes in water-colours
John Henry Lorimer (1856–1936), portraitist and genre painter, brother of architect Robert Lorimer
Robert Macaulay Stevenson (1854–1952), painter
Robert Walker Macbeth (1848–1910), painter, water-colourist and print-maker
Henry Macbeth-Raeburn (1860–1947), painter and print-maker
Dugald MacColl (1859–1948)
Frances MacDonald (1873–1921), Glasgow School artist, sister of Margaret
Margaret MacDonald (1865–1933), Glasgow School artist, wife of Charles Rennie Mackintosh
James MacGillivray (1856–1938), sculptor
William York Macgregor (1855–1923), landscape artist
Esther Blaikie MacKinnon (1885–1934), painter and engraver
Charles Rennie Mackintosh (1868–1928), architect, designer, husband of Margaret MacDonald
Chica Macnab (1889–1980), painter and wood engraver
James Herbert MacNair (1868–1955), Glasgow School artist, designer and teacher
Harrington Mann (1864–1937), portraitist and decorative painter, member of the Glasgow Boys movement
George Manson (1850–1876), water-colourist
James McBey (1883–1959), painter, etcher and war artist
Horatio McCulloch (1806–1867), landscape painter
R. R. McIan (1803–1856), painter
William McTaggart (1835–1910), landscape painter
Arthur Melville (1858–1904), painter remembered for Oriental subjects
James Coutts Michie (1859-1919), landscape and portrait painter
Thomas Corsan Morton (1859–1928), artist known as one of the Glasgow Boys
James MacLauchlan Nairn (1859–1904), Glasgow-born painter who influenced late 19th-century New Zealand painting
Charlotte Nasmyth (1804–1884), landscape painter, daughter of Alexander Nasmyth
Jessie Newbery (1864–1948), Glasgow School artist and embroiderer
James Campbell Noble (1846–1913), landscape and marine painter
Robert Noble, (1857–1917), painter of landscapes, first President of the Society of Scottish Artists
Emily Murray Paterson (1855–1934), painter
James Paterson (1854–1932), landscape and portrait painter associated with The Glasgow Boys movement
Viola Paterson (1899–1981), painter, wood engraver
Sir Joseph Noel Paton (1821–1901), painter of religious subjects
Samuel John Peploe (1871–1935), member of the Scottish Colourist school of painting
John Pettie (1839–1893), painter
Sir George Pirie (1863–1946), artist associated with the Glasgow Boys in the 1880s
John Quinton Pringle (1865–1925), painter influenced by Jules Bastien-Lepage and associated with the Glasgow Boys
Annie Pirie Quibell (1862–1927), artist and archaeologist
Arabella Rankin (1871 – c. 1935) painter and coloured woodcut artist
Anne Redpath (1895–1967), artist best known for still life works
Sir George Reid (1841–1913), landscape and portrait painter
John Robertson Reid (1851–1926), painter
John Stevenson Rhind (1859–1937), sculptor
Robert Sivell (1888–1958), painter
Sir John Robert Steell RSA (1804–1891), sculptor, including the statue of Sir Walter Scott at the Scott Monument
David Watson Stevenson (1842–1904), sculptor of portraits and monuments in marble and bronze
William Grant Stevenson (1849–1919), sculptor and painter
David Macbeth Sutherland (1883–1973), painter of Scottish and Breton landscapes, and of portraits
Adam Bruce Thomson (1885–1976), The Edinburgh School artist, landscape and portrait painter
Ottilie Maclaren Wallace (1875–1947), sculptor
Edward Arthur Walton (1860–1922), painter of landscapes and portraits
Cecile Walton (1891–1956), painter, illustrator and sculptor 
George Fiddes Watt (1873–1960), portrait painter and engraver
James Cromar Watt (1862–1940), artist, architect and jeweller
Saul Yaffie (1898–1957), Jewish artist later known as Paul Jeffay

Born 1900–1949

David Annand (born 1948), sculptor
Eric Auld (1931–2013), painter
Robert Bain (1911–1973), sculptor and art professor in South Africa
Edward Baird (1904–1949), painter
Barbara Balmer (1929–2017), painter
Mardi Barrie (1930–2004), painter
John Bellany (1942–2013), painter
Helen Biggar (1909–1953), sculptor, film-maker and theatre designer
Douglas Robertson Bisset (1908–2000), sculptor 
Sam Black (1913–1997)
Robert Henderson Blyth (1919–1970)
Leonard Boden (1911-1999), portrait painter
Margaret Boden (1912–2001), painter
John Boyd (1925–2018), milliner 
Mary Syme Boyd (1910–1997), artist and sculptor 
Jimmy Boyle (born 1944), sculptor, author and convicted murderer
Mark Boyle (1934–2005)
Howard Butterworth, painter working in Aberdeenshire since the 1960s
John Byrne (born 1940)
W. Lindsay Cable (1900–1949), illustrator for Punch and Enid Blyton
Robert Colquhoun (1914–1962), painter and print-maker
Victoria Crowe (born 1945)
Richard Demarco (born 1930), artist and promoter of visual and performing arts
David Abercrombie Donaldson (1916–1996), painter and limner to Her Majesty The Queen
Margaret Cross Primrose Findlay (1902–1968), sculptor and modeller
Ian Hamilton Finlay (1925–2006), sculptor and installation artist
Hannah Frank (1908–2008), artist and sculptor
Alison Cornwall Geissler MBE, (1907–2011), glass engraver 
Marianne Grant (1921-2007), artist
Tom Gourdie (1913–2005), artist
Alasdair Gray (1934–2019), artist and writer
Thomas Symington Halliday (1902–1998), painter and sculptor
Alison Kinnaird M.B.E (born 1949), glass artist, musician, teacher and writer 
Hew Lorimer (1907–1993), sculptor and brother of architect Robert Lorimer
Edwin G Lucas (1911–1990), painter
Robert MacBryde (1913–1966), painter and theatre-set designer
Hamish MacDonald (1935–2008), artist 
Rory McEwen (1932–1982), artist and musician
George McGavin (1915–2004), painter
William MacTaggart (1903–1981), landscape painter
John Maxwell (1905–1962), painter of landscapes and imaginative subjects
David Michie (1928–2015), painter
James Morrison (1932–2020), landscape painter
John Lowrie Morrison (born 1948), expressionist oil painter of Scottish landscapes
Alberto Morrocco (1917–1998), artist
Eduardo Paolozzi (1924–2005), sculptor
James McIntosh Patrick (1907–1998), painter of landscapes and portraits
Ronald Rae (born 1946), granite sculptor and artist
Pat Semple (1939–2021), landscape artist
Pamela So (1947–2010), multimedia artist and photographer
Ancell Stronach (1901–1981), artist
Alan Sutherland (1931–2019), portrait painter
Alasdair Taylor (1934–2007), sculptor
Sylvia Wishart (1936–2008), Orcadian landscape artist
George Wyllie MBE (1921–2012), sculptor known for public art

Born 1950–1999

Crawfurd Adamson (born 1953), figurative artist
Charles Avery (born 1973), artist
David Batchelor (born 1955)
Karla Black (born 1972), sculptor nominated for 2011 Turner Prize
Martin Boyce (born 1967), sculptor
Hugh Buchanan (born 1958), water-colourist
Roderick Buchanan (born 1965), artist working in film and photography
Paul Carter (1970–2006) artist known for constructions
Stephen Conroy (born 1964)
Andrew Cranston (born 1969), painter
Ken Currie (born 1960), English-born member of New Glasgow Boys
Helen Denerley (born 1956), sculptor often reusing scrap
Alan Dimmick (born 1956), photographer of the Glasgow art scene.
Helen Douglas (book artist) (born 1952), book artist
Kate Downie (born 1958), painter and print-maker
Erica Eyres (born 1980), Canadian-born artist
Lizzie Farey (born 1962), willow sculptor and artist
Michael Fullerton (born 1971), portrait painter based in London
Anya Gallaccio (born 1963), creator of minimalist installations
Douglas Gordon (born 1966), winner of 1996 Turner Prize
Andrew Grassie (born 1966), painter in tempera
Claire Harrigan (born 1964), painter
Peter Howson (born 1958), painter and official war artist
Richard Johnson (born 1966), Scotland-born and educated war artist
Anna King (born 1984), painter
Henry Kondracki (born 1953), painter
David Mach (born 1956), sculptor and installation artist
John McKenna (born 1964), public artist, statue and monument creator
Abigail McLellan (1969–2009), artist
Susan Philipsz OBE (born 1965), sound installation artist, winner of 2010 Turner Prize
Andy Scott (born 1964), figurative sculptor
Lucy Skaer (born 1975), sculptor and painter
Carol Rhodes (1959–2018), painter
Evlynn Smith (1962–2003), artist, designer and furniture maker
Alexander Stoddart (born 1959), neoclassical sculptor
Thomson & Craighead (Alison Craighead born 1971), works with video and internet
Jack Vettriano (born 1951), painter
Alison Watt (born 1965), painter

Born 2000 and after

See also
Art in Scotland
List of Scottish women artists

References

 
Lists of artists by nationality
Artists